The Zhumapu Formation is an early Late Cretaceous (estimated Cenomanian) geologic formation in Shanxi Province, China. The hadrosauroids Yunganglong and Zuoyunlong and the informally named ankylosaur "Jindipelta" have been recovered from this unit.

See also 
 List of dinosaur-bearing rock formations
 Sunjiawan Formation

References

Bibliography 

Lei et al. (2019) NEW DISCOVERY OF ANKYLOSAUR FOSSILS FROM SHANXI PROVINCE, CHINA (IN PRESS).
  
    

Geologic formations of China
Upper Cretaceous Series of Asia
Cretaceous China
Cenomanian Stage
Paleontology in Shanxi